TWA Hotel is a hotel at John F. Kennedy International Airport in Queens, New York City, that opened on May 15, 2019. It utilizes the head house of the TWA Flight Center, designed in 1962 by the architect Eero Saarinen. The TWA Hotel project added two buildings on either side of the existing head house. It contains a total of 512 rooms, as well as conference space, several restaurants, and an aviation history museum.

TWA Hotel was developed as part of a project to reuse the head house, which had stopped functioning as an air terminal in 2001. Morse Development developed the site along with MCR, which operates middle-to-budget hotels in the United States. It is the only hotel operating within the boundaries of JFK Airport.

History
After the TWA Flight Center closed in 2001, the Port Authority of New York and New Jersey sought to redevelop or reuse the terminal. The main building, or head house, was protected from demolition; it had been made a New York City designated landmark in 1994, and subsequently was added to the National Register of Historic Places in 2005. The head house went largely unused until it was ultimately incorporated into an expansion of Terminal 5, which was completed in 2008 and is occupied by JetBlue Airways.

In April 2015, The Wall Street Journal reported that JetBlue and its partner, a hotel developer, were negotiating for the rights to turn the head house into a hotel. In July 2015, New York Governor Andrew Cuomo confirmed that the Saarinen building would be converted into a new on-site hotel for the airport's passengers.

Construction 
Groundbreaking took place on December 15, 2016, in a ceremony attended by Governor Cuomo, Queens Borough President Melinda Katz, and former employees of Trans World Airlines. A topping out ceremony for the hotel's first tower was held in December 2017, followed by the topping out of the second tower in March 2018. The next month, a model hotel room built inside a JFK Airport hangar was shown to the press. 

That October, a Lockheed Constellation L-1649 Starliner was shipped to the hotel site for conversion into a cocktail bar. The Starliner arrived at the hotel site at the end of November 2018. In March it was displayed in Times Square. 

The hotel started taking reservations in February 2019 in advance of a May opening. The hotel opened on May 15, 2019.

Description

Morse Development developed the site along with MCR, which operates middle-to-budget hotels in the United States. It is the only hotel operating within the boundaries of JFK Airport. Beyer Blinder Belle is the architectural firm responsible for renovating the terminal, while Lubrano Ciavarra Architects designed the two new buildings. Stonehill Taylor designed the hotel rooms, and INC Architecture and Design designed the underground event space with 45 meeting rooms and a  meeting hall. Arup provided structural engineering, with Jaros, Baum & Bolles delivering MEP services.

Two buildings named Saarinen Wing and Hughes Wing, north and south of the T5 terminal structure, encircle the original headhouse to the east. The two buildings contain a total of 512 rooms between them, as well as conference space, six to eight restaurants, and an aviation history museum. The developers have a 75-year lease with the state. 

Many of the TWA Flight Center's original details, such as the custom ceramic floor tiles and the 486 variously-shaped window panels, were replaced with replicas of the originals. These details were intended to give the hotel a 1960s-era vibe, and include brass lighting, walnut-accented furnishings, and rotary phones. The hallways contain red carpeting, evocative of the color of the furniture in the original TWA lounge. However, the rooms also contain modern amenities such as blackout curtains and multiple-pane soundproof windows. The large departure board, a split-flap display made in Italy by Solari di Udine and which has been a feature of the building since the Flight Center's opening in 1962, was fully restored as part of the hotel project. The TWA Hotel also includes a cocktail lounge installed inside a preserved Lockheed L-1649 Starliner, the last model of the Lockheed Constellation line of airliners; the lounge is nicknamed "Connie". The hotel includes the Paris Café, a Jean-Georges Vongerichten restaurant, as well.

During construction, a sales office and exhibition center, located on the 86th floor of One World Trade Center, was occasionally opened to the public.

Critical reception
In the September 2–9, 2019, issue of Time, the hotel was placed on the magazine's list of "The World's Greatest Places of 2019". The hotel was featured as the cover story in Interior Design magazine's September 2019 issue.

References

External links

TWA Hotel and Lounge, Travel and Leisure

2019 establishments in New York City
Hotels established in 2019
2010s in Queens
Hotels in Queens, New York
John F. Kennedy International Airport
Trans World Airlines